Nakai may refer to:

People
 Nakai (surname)
 In botany, an abbreviation for author Takenoshin Nakai

Places
 Nakai, Kanagawa, Japan
 Nakai District, Laos
 Nakai Misl, former principality of the Punjab Region

Others
 Nakai (Japanese vocation)
 Nakai, a captive orca
 Nakai, a Lizardman in the Warhammer game
 Nakai, a race in the Stargate Universe